Richard of Vaucelles was an English Cistercian monk, who was appointed by St. Bernard as the second abbot of the Vaucelles Abbey, France. He is recognised as a saint with the feast day of 28 January.

References

English Roman Catholic saints
French Roman Catholic saints
12th-century Christian saints
1169 deaths
English Cistercians
Year of birth unknown